Hochen Tan (born 6 December 1950) is a Taiwanese politician. He was the Minister of Transportation and Communications of the Republic of China from 20 May 2016 until 16 July 2018. He is the elder brother of Hocheng Hong.

Education
Hochen obtained his bachelor's degree in civil engineering from National Chung Hsing University in 1973, and his master's degree in urban and regional planning from Virginia Polytechnic Institute and State University in the United States in 1980.

Transportation and Communications Minister

2016 APEC Tourism Ministerial Meeting
Hochen led a delegation from Taiwan to attend the APEC Tourism Ministerial Meeting on 28–29 May 2016 in Peru.

References

1950 births
Living people
Taiwanese Ministers of Transportation and Communications
National Chung Hsing University alumni
Virginia Tech alumni